Tubuai or Tupuai is the main island of the Austral Island group, located  south of Tahiti.  In addition to Tubuai, the group of islands include Rimatara, Rurutu, Raivavae, Rapa and the uninhabited Îles Maria.  They are part of the Austral Islands in the far southwest of French Polynesia in the south Pacific Ocean. Tubuai island sustains a population of 2,217 people on 45 km2 of land. Due to its southerly position, Tubuai has notably cooler weather than Tahiti.

The island is ringed by a lagoon formed by an encircling coral reef.  A break in the reef that enables passage for ships is located on the north side of the island. Tubuai has two lava domes, with its highest point, Mt Taita'a, being 422 meters.  Six or seven islets or motus lie along the reef rim that encircles the island.  These were described in the late 1700s as having an abundance of toa trees (Casuarina equisetifolia), which the indigenous peoples used in house building and to make war clubs and spears due to the wood's density.

The people of Tubuai once spoke the Austral language but it has been replaced by the closely related Tahitian language.

History

Early Polynesia
The island has been inhabited since at least 1215CE. In the ancient past a road was built that encircled the island.  There exists on the island today the  stone ruins of a “great number of structures, house platforms, marae complexes, and cemeteries...”  According to David Stanley's South Pacific Handbook:

"The Austral islands were one of the great art areas of the Pacific, represented today in many museums.  The best-known artifacts are tall sharkskin drums, wooden bowls, fly-whisks, and tapa cloth."

Arrival of Bounty mutineers

Tubuai was first viewed by Europeans when it was mapped by James Cook in 1777, although his party did not disembark.  Cook discovered the island's name, "Toobouai", from the natives who surrounded his ship in their canoes; a Tahitian named Omai, who was part of Cook's group, translated.

The next Europeans to arrive were the mutineers of HMS Bounty in 1789. Mutineer Fletcher Christian, in looking for an island on which to permanently hide, had "scoured" William Bligh's maps and nautical charts and decided on Tubuai.

Upon arrival at Tubuai, a conflict arose while the mutineers were still on their ship and several islanders were killed in their canoes.  The site of this event in the lagoon on the north side of the island is called Baie Sanglant "Bloody Bay".

Mutineer James Morrison wrote: "The Island is full of Inhabitants for its size and may Contain 3000 souls."  After only ten days on the island, the mutineers sailed for Tahiti to get women and livestock in which they were only nominally successful.  When they returned to Tubuai, they built a fort on the northeast part of the island at Ta'ahueia, manned with cannon and swivel gun which they named Fort George.  The mutineer leader, Fletcher Christian, knew that settling on Tahiti was sure to mean the mutineers' eventual discovery and arrest, so despite being viewed as intruders, Christian was reluctant to view permanent settlement on Tubuai as unfeasible. Christian favoured using diplomacy over time to eventually obtain wives, but many of the other mutineers insisted on raiding parties to take wives by force.

The islanders of Tubuai did not want to allow their women to stay at the mutineer camp or to allow them to become wives.  They also were not disposed to trade food. It was not long before armed parties of mutineers started burning houses and desecrating marae during skirmishes to obtain women. More battles ensued and more natives were killed. One mutineer, the heavily tattooed Thomas Burkett (who was later tried and hanged in England for mutiny), was speared in the side by one of the islanders during one of the skirmishes.

After only two months since their first arrival on Tubuai, the mutineers left for good.

1800s
Increased contact with Europeans also meant more exposure to diseases to which the islanders had no immunity.  This proved particularly devastating to the population of Tubuai.  At some point during the 30 years from when the mutineers left the island on September 17, 1789, and the early 1820s when accounts by Christian missionaries began to be recorded, the population that was estimated by the mutineer Morrison to be 3000 was now reduced to no more than 300 people.  One Protestant minister when visiting a congregation on Tubuai on January 3, 1824, wrote that several islanders were still suffering from a devastating illness. He described the symptoms and noted that several hundred had died within the previous four years.

Geography
Tupua'i is located just north of the Tropic of Capricorn. The island is at the centre of the Austral Islands, located 195 km from Ra'ivāvae, 210 km from Rurutu, 700 km from  Rapa Iti and 640 km south of Tahiti.

It consists of two former sets of volcanic peaks on Mount Taita'a which are separated by the collar of Huahine.

Its depth is low, leading to a characteristic colour of turquoise or jade. The waters are constantly replenished via a rather strong and fairly constant ocean current, contributing to the preservation of the lagoon habitat and the health of the coral in the reef. The generally cooler waters and until recently very low pollution have also helped sustain this environment.

Many small streams run through the island, though they often empty into swamps rather than the sea. These swamps represent a fairly large portion of the island. Only the river Vaiohuru has any real flow.

Eight offshore motu surround the main island (with an additional 0.4 km2):

Motu One (also known as îlot de sable (Sandly Islet) in the North)
Motu Rautaro
Motu Toena
Motu Roa (also called Motu Tāpapatava'e)
Motu Mitihā (originally Motiha'a)
Motu 'Ōfa'i (also called  îlot caillou (Rock Island))
'Iri'iriroa 
Îlot plat (Flat Island)

The islets above are listed in clockwise direction from the north of the island. The last two islands are often submerged and hence not visible.

The motu 'Ōfa'i is itself the only island that has not formed through coral because it is composed of basalt, hence its name. It is also the only outcrop of volcanic land other than the main island.

Climate
The climate of Tubuai is cooler than Tahiti, with temperatures averaging . The island has hot, muggy summers and warm, humid winters with ample precipitation all year. The lagoon waters typically reach  in summer but only drop a few degrees in winter.

Rainfall is high, averaging about 2000 mm (78 inches) per year with about 1700 mm (67 inches) per year for the years 2006 and 2007. The highest recorded rainfall 2839 mm (112 inches) in 1962 and the lowest was 1186 mm (47 inches) 1952. The record for rainfall in a day is in turn 191 mm (8 inches) on 23 April 1942.

Hours of sunlight is about average for the Australs and is around 1970 hours per year, one of the lowest levels in Polynesia. The humidity is lower in contrast to Tahiti in the order of a few percent, mainly due to its higher latitude and its lower altitude (thus retaining fewer clouds).

The trade winds coming from southeast are the prevailing winds. Those coming from the North or Northwest are synonymous with a  change towards more sunny days. The maximum recorded wind speeds, however, never exceeded 45 m/s.

The island has also been the scene of several cyclones, though they are not very frequent and are often weakened before reaching landfall (as with Cyclone Meena in 2004). However, much bigger cyclones occasionally hit the island. As such, on 5 February 2010, Tupua'i found itself in the path of Cyclone Oli with winds averaging 160 km/h (gusting nearly 220 km/h).

Average weather records on Tupua'i:

Demographics
Since the 1990s, the island's population has stabilised to approximately 2000 inhabitants.

Evolution of the population of Tupua'i since its discovery:

Administration
Tubuai is the administrative capital of the Austral Islands, and the commune consists solely of this one island, including the six or seven motus surrounding it. Tubuai was annexed by France in 1881. The commune itself consists of the following associated communes:

Mahu
Mataura
Taahuaia

See also
Flora of Tubuai
List of French islands in the Indian and Pacific oceans

Notes and references

External links

   Natural and cultural heritage of Tubuai on Tahiti Heritage with Google maps

Islands of the Austral Islands
Communes of French Polynesia